The Keraterm camp was a concentration  camp established by Bosnian Serb military and police authorities near the town of Prijedor in northern Bosnia and Herzegovina during the Bosnian War. The camp was used to collect and confine between 1,000–1,500 Bosniak and Bosnian Croat civilians.

The camp
The Keraterm camp was located on the site of a ceramics factory, just outside the city of Prijedor. According to reports, prisoners were kept in four halls, formerly used as storehouses at the ceramics factory.  The Keraterm camp's prisoner population was all male. Most of the men at the camp were reported to be between the ages of 15 and 60. However, in mid-July 1992, approximately 12 to 15 Bosniak women were brought to Keraterm, raped, and transported to the Omarska camp. About 85% of all prisoners were Bosniaks while about 15% were Bosnian Croats.

According to the indictment, the detainees were, among other things, subjected to physical violence, constant humiliation, degradation, inhumane conditions, and fear of death. Severe beatings were commonplace. All manner of weapons were used during these beatings, including wooden batons, metal rods, baseball bats, lengths of thick industrial cable that had metal balls affixed to the end, rifle butts, and knives. Killings, beatings, sexual assaults, and other cruel and humiliating actions were committed.

War crime trials 
The Republika Srpska officials responsible for running the camp have since been convicted for genocide, crimes against humanity and war crimes. Duško Knežević was found guilty of the criminal offence of Crimes against Humanity and sentenced him to a long-term imprisonment of 31 years. Željko Mejakić was found guilty for the criminal offense of Crimes against Humanity and sentenced him to the long-term imprisonment of 21 years. Duško Sikirica, commander of the Keraterm camp, pleaded guilty to crimes against humanity and was sentenced to a jail term of fifteen years. Dušan Fuštar was found guilty for having participated, by acting and failing to act, in a joint criminal enterprise and sentenced him to 9 years imprisonment for "having failed to exercise his authority and prevent the crimes." Predrag Banović who pleaded guilty to 25 charges and was sentenced to 8 years in prison. Damir Došen was sentenced to 5 years imprisonment. Dragan Kolundžija was sentenced to 3 years imprisonment.

See also
Batković concentration camp
Dretelj camp
Čelebići prison camp
Gabela camp
Heliodrom camp
Liplje camp
Manjača camp
Omarska camp
Trnopolje camp
Uzamnica camp
Vilina Vlas
Vojno camp

References

External links
Keraterm case
Concentration camps in Bosnia
 Radovan Karadzic $5 million Reward - The U.S. Government is offering $5 million reward for information leading to the arrest of Radovan Karadzic
 Ratko Mladic $5 million Reward - The U.S. Government is offering $5 million reward for information leading to the arrest of Ratko Mladic

1992 establishments in Bosnia and Herzegovina
Bosnian genocide
1994 disestablishments in Bosnia and Herzegovina
Serbian concentration camps in the Yugoslav Wars
Serbian war crimes in the Bosnian War
Bosnian War internment camps